Microbacterium laevaniformans is a bacterium from the genus Microbacterium.

References 

Bacteria described in 1962
laevaniformans